Elena Darikovich (1951–2017) was a Russian photographer. 

Her work is included in the collections of the Museum of Fine Arts Houston, the Art Institute of Chicago, and the Museum of Contemporary Photography.

References

Living people
1962 births
20th-century Russian artists
20th-century Russian photographers
21st-century Russian artists
21st-century Russian photographers
20th-century Russian women artists
21st-century Russian women artists